In physics, the Polyakov action is an action of the two-dimensional conformal field theory describing the worldsheet of a string in string theory. It was introduced by Stanley Deser and Bruno Zumino and independently by L. Brink, P. Di Vecchia and P. S. Howe in 1976, and has become associated with Alexander Polyakov after he made use of it in quantizing the string in 1981. The action reads

 

The metric signature is chosen such that timelike directions are + and the spacelike directions are −. The spacelike worldsheet coordinate is called , whereas the timelike worldsheet coordinate is called . This is also known as the nonlinear sigma model.

The Polyakov action must be supplemented by the Liouville action to describe string fluctuations.

Global symmetries 
N.B.: Here, a symmetry is said to be local or global from the two dimensional theory (on the worldsheet) point of view. For example, Lorentz transformations, that are local symmetries of the space-time, are global symmetries of the theory on the worldsheet.

The action is invariant under spacetime translations and infinitesimal Lorentz transformations
This forms the Poincaré symmetry of the target manifold.

The proof of the invariance under (ii) is as follows:

Local symmetries 

The action is invariant under worldsheet diffeomorphisms (or coordinates transformations) and Weyl transformations.

Diffeomorphisms 
Assume the following transformation:
 
It transforms the metric tensor in the following way:
 
One can see that:
 

One knows that the Jacobian of this transformation is given by
 
which leads to
 
and one sees that
 
Summing up this transformation and relabeling , we see that the action is invariant.

Weyl transformation 
Assume the Weyl transformation:
 
then
 
And finally:
 {|
| 
| 
|-
|
|
|}
And one can see that the action is invariant under Weyl transformation. If we consider n-dimensional (spatially) extended objects whose action is proportional to their worldsheet area/hyperarea, unless n = 1, the corresponding Polyakov action would contain another term breaking Weyl symmetry.

One can define the stress–energy tensor:
 
Let's define:
 
Because of Weyl symmetry, the action does not depend on :
 
where we've used the functional derivative chain rule.

Relation with Nambu–Goto action 

Writing the Euler–Lagrange equation for the metric tensor  one obtains that
 
Knowing also that:
 
One can write the variational derivative of the action:
 
where , which leads to
 

If the auxiliary worldsheet metric tensor  is calculated from the equations of motion:
 
and substituted back to the action, it becomes the Nambu–Goto action:
 

However, the Polyakov action is more easily quantized because it is linear.

Equations of motion 

Using diffeomorphisms and Weyl transformation, with a Minkowskian target space, one can make the physically insignificant transformation , thus writing the action in the conformal gauge:
 
where .

Keeping in mind that  one can derive the constraints:
 

Substituting , one obtains
 

And consequently
 

The boundary conditions to satisfy the second part of the variation of the action are as follows.
 Closed strings:
 Periodic boundary conditions: 
 Open strings:
Working in light-cone coordinates , we can rewrite the equations of motion as

 

By Fourier-expanding the solution and imposing canonical commutation relations on the coefficients, applying the second equation of motion motivates the definition of the Virasoro operators and lead to the Virasoro constraints that vanish when acting on physical states.

See also 
 D-brane
 Einstein–Hilbert action

References

Further reading 
 Polchinski (Nov, 1994). What is String Theory, NSF-ITP-94-97, 153 pp., arXiv:hep-th/9411028v1.
 Ooguri, Yin (Feb, 1997). TASI Lectures on Perturbative String Theories, UCB-PTH-96/64, LBNL-39774, 80 pp., arXiv:hep-th/9612254v3.

Conformal field theory
String theory